Maximum the Hormone (マキシマムザホルモン, Makishimamu Za Horumon) is a four-member Japanese nu metal band.

Studio albums

Extended plays

Singles

Video albums

Music videos

References 

Discographies of Japanese artists
Heavy metal group discographies